The discography of Kittie, a Canadian heavy metal band, consists of six studio albums, one video album, four extended plays, thirteen singles and thirteen music videos.

Albums

Studio albums

Video albums

Extended plays

Singles

Other appearances

Music videos

References

Discographies of Canadian artists
Heavy metal group discographies